Below is a list of busiest airports by passenger traffic from 2010 to 2015.

2015 statistics 
Airports Council International's full-year figures are as follows:

2014 statistics 
Airports Council International's full-year figures are as follows:

2013 statistics
Airports Council International's full-year figures are as follows:

2012 statistics
Airports Council International's preliminary full-year figures are as follows:

2011 statistics
Airports Council International's final full-year figures are as follows:

2010 statistics
Airports Council International's final full-year figures are as follows:

See also
 List of the busiest airports
 List of busiest airports by aircraft movements
 Busiest airports by continent

References

Lists of airports
 Passenger traffic 2010-2015